John Hoge House, also known as the Crozier Eaton House, is a historic home located at Belspring, Pulaski County, Virginia. The original section was built about 1800, as a two-story, log dwelling with a hall-parlor plan. In the third quarter of the 19th century, a major frame addition was made to the house, transforming it to a two-story, three bay, central hall plan dwelling.  In addition, Greek Revival decorative additions were made to the interior.

It was added to the National Register of Historic Places in 1988.

References

Houses on the National Register of Historic Places in Virginia
Houses completed in 1800
Greek Revival houses in Virginia
Houses in Pulaski County, Virginia
National Register of Historic Places in Pulaski County, Virginia